Melanie Hamrick (born 1987) is an American choreographer and former ballerina at the American Ballet Theatre, from which she retired in 2019 after fifteen years. In 2014, she began a relationship with the musician Mick Jagger, with whom she has one child, born in 2016.

References

American ballerinas
Living people
1987 births